Arthur Hobbs may refer to:

Arthur Hobbs (WFA), first secretary of the WFA in 1969
Arthur Hobbs (Canadian football) (born 1989)
Arthur Hobbs (mathematician) (born 1940)
Arthur Hobbs (How I Met Your Mother), a fictional character from How I Met Your Mother